Huang Yiguang was a Mexican-born Chinese politician, aviator, and explorer. He was born into a well-connected and wealthy family in Mexico and served as a pilot in the Chinese air force during World War II. 

He took part in one of a number of assassination attempts on the life of the Chinese politician Wang Jingwei, who collaborated with Japan during their occupation of China from 1937 to 1945. An aviator and explorer, he travelled widely with strong connections with the Chinese community in the United Kingdom. A former associate of Wang, he was welcomed in Wang's inner circle, but his assassination attempt failed when his radio equipment was discovered. He was executed by the Empire of Japan on 17 December 1940.

References 

1940 deaths
Year of birth unknown
1940 crimes in China
Chinese people of World War II
Failed assassins
Executed Republic of China people
20th-century executions by Japan
People executed for attempted murder
Chinese aviators
Chinese explorers
Chinese expatriates in the United Kingdom
Mexican people of Chinese descent